Trevlac is an unincorporated community in Jackson Township, Brown County, in the U.S. state of Indiana.

History
Trevlac was the name of Colonel Calvert, reversed. A post office was established at Trevlac in 1907. But there was already a Calvert, Indiana, so the Post Office said a different name would be needed. It remained in operation until it was discontinued in 1966.

Geography

See also
 List of geographic names derived from anagrams and ananyms

References

Unincorporated communities in Brown County, Indiana
Unincorporated communities in Indiana